B350 can refer to:

 The B350 chipset for AMD's socket AM4.
 The Beechcraft Super King Air 350 airplane.